Hans-Jürgen Riemenschneider (born May 4, 1949 in Bad Nauheim) is a West German sprint canoer who competed in the early 1970s. He finished eighth in the K-2 1000 m event at the 1972 Summer Olympics in Munich.

References
 Sports-reference.com profile

1949 births
Canoeists at the 1972 Summer Olympics
German male canoeists
Living people
Olympic canoeists of West Germany
People from Bad Nauheim
Sportspeople from Darmstadt (region)